Andy Uren (born 20 February 1996) is an English professional rugby union player who plays scrum-half for the Bristol Bears in Premiership Rugby.

Uren will join Italian United Rugby Championship club Benetton on a three-year contract from the 2023–24 season.

References

Living people
1996 births
Bristol Bears players
Rugby union scrum-halves